Hamza Chatholi (born 1 November 1981) is an Indian athlete who competes in the 1500 metres event. In the 2007 Asian Indoor Games, he won the gold medal in beating defending champion Abubaker Ali Kamal of Qatar and set a new games record.

References

External links
 
 Profile at all-athletics.com

1981 births
Living people
Indian male middle-distance runners
Athletes (track and field) at the 2010 Commonwealth Games
Commonwealth Games competitors for India
Athletes (track and field) at the 2006 Asian Games
Athletes (track and field) at the 2010 Asian Games
South Asian Games gold medalists for India
Asian Games competitors for India
South Asian Games medalists in athletics